Håkan Spik (born 18 August 1951) is a Finnish long-distance runner. He competed in the marathon at the 1976 Summer Olympics and the 1980 Summer Olympics.

References

External links
 

1951 births
Living people
Athletes (track and field) at the 1976 Summer Olympics
Athletes (track and field) at the 1980 Summer Olympics
Finnish male long-distance runners
Finnish male marathon runners
Olympic athletes of Finland
People from Kronoby
Sportspeople from Ostrobothnia (region)